The Teatro delle Quattro Fontane (Theatre of the Four Fountains) is an opera house in Rome, Italy, designed (in part) by Gian Lorenzo Bernini and built in 1632 by the Barberini family.  It was located in Via delle Quattro Fontane, near the Piazza Barberini and the Quattro Fontane or Four Fountains.

History

The theatre opened in 1632 with the opera, Sant' Alessio (Saint Alexis; first performed in 1631), composed by Stefano Landi to a libretto by Giulio Rospigliosi, a protégé of the Barberini Pope Urban VIII, later himself elected Pope Clement IX. The theatre could seat 3000.

The theatre closed temporarily in 1642 at the height of the Barberini Wars of Castro with the Farnese Dukes of Parma which became incredibly expensive for the family and the Holy See. The theatre had not yet reopened before when its patrons, the three Barberini nephews of Pope Urban (Francesco Barberini, Antonio Barberini (Antonio the Younger), and Taddeo Barberini), were sent into exile by the newly elected Pope Innocent X.

Finally in 1653, after more than 10 years with its doors closed, Taddeo's son Maffeo Barberini returned to Rome and married Olimpia Giustiniani; finally reconciling the Barberini with the papacy. As the new Prince of Palestrina he reopened the theatre and recommenced performances.

In 1632, the theatre was rebuilt and was particularly active during the late 1940s, after World War II.

See also
Baroque architecture
List of theatres and opera houses in Rome

References

External links
Official website.

Opera houses in Rome
1632 establishments in the Papal States
Buildings and structures completed in 1632
17th-century establishments in Italy
Music venues completed in 1632
Theatres completed in 1632
1632 establishments in Italy